Pamela Hallock Muller is a scientist and professor at the University of South Florida in the College of Marine Science. Her research has focused on reef-associated Foraminifera and algal symbiosis, extending into coral-reef ecology, paleobiology and carbonate sedimentology. She has worked as a diversity and inclusion advocate that has promoted gender equality within academia and marine science.

Early years and education 
Born on a small ranch on the Rosebud Reservation in south-central South Dakota, Pamela Hallock attended elementary school in a one-room schoolhouse and started high school in Mission before, in 1963, her family moved to Missoula, Montana, where she completed high school. Hallock received her Bachelor's degree in zoology from the University of Montana, Missoula in 1969, and married a fellow zoology major, Robert Muller, in summer 1969. She received her Master's and Ph.D. degrees in oceanography from the University of Hawaii in 1972 and 1977.

Early career 
Pamela Hallock Muller started as an assistant professor at the University of Texas of the Permian Basin in Odessa, TX, in 1978. She then moved to the University of South Florida as an associate professor in 1983 where she became a full professor in 1988.

Research
Hallock Muller uses field studies to understand the role of nutrients, light and ocean chemistry in coral reefs, carbonate sedimentology and paleoceanography. She has studied algal symbiosis in the context of carbonate production, community structure and evolution of coral reefs. A key aspect of her research is the study of reef-associated Foraminifera, including distributions, population dynamics and functional morphologies, with applications in studies of environmental quality, paleoenvironments, carbonate sedimentation, and global environmental change. Her 1986 paper in PALAIOS with colleague Wolfgang Schlager—”Nutrient excess in the demise of coral reefs and carbonate platforms”—was named one the “Landmark Papers in Carbonate Sedimentology and Stratigraphy” by the American Association of Petroleum Geologists 100th Anniversary Committee in 2017. She participated in a 10-day saturation mission in the NOAA-National Undersea Research Center's Aquarius Habitat in 1994. She participated in the International Ocean Discovery Program's Leg 194 in 2001.

A mentor for women and underrepresented minorities, Hallock Muller has received the Association for Women Geoscientists Outstanding Educator Award in 1999, Alfred P. Sloan Foundation Minority Ph.D. Program's Mentor of the Year in 2012, and USF graduate-mentor awards in 2014 and 2016. She was also named one of the Top 25 women professors in Florida in 2013.

Awards and honors 
 2012. Elected Fellow, The Paleontological Society
 2015. Joseph A. Cushman Award for Excellence in Foraminiferal Research 
 2017 Who's Who Lifetime Achievement –Education, Science
 2018. Hallock & Schlager (1986) named one of ten “Landmark Papers in Carbonate Sedimentology and Stratigraphy” by the American Association of Petroleum Geologists 
 2019. Raymond C. Moore Medal for Excellence in Paleontological Research, Society for Sedimentary Geology

Selected publications
Hallock, P. 1985. Why are larger foraminifera large? Paleobiology 11:195–208
Hallock, P. and W. Schlager. 1986. Nutrient excess and the demise of coral reefs and carbonate platforms. Palaios 1:389–398
Hallock, P. and E. C. Glenn. 1986. Larger foraminifera: a tool for paleoenvironmental analysis of Cenozoic carbonate facies. Palaios 1:55–64
Hallock, P. 1987. Fluctuations in the trophic resource continuum: a factor in global diversity cycles? Paleoceanography 2:457–471
Hallock, P. 1988. The role of nutrient availability in bioerosion: consequences to carbonate buildups. Palaeogeography, Palaeoclimatology, Palaeoecology 63:275–291
Cockey, E.M., P. Hallock, and B. Lidz. 1996. Decadal scale changes in benthic foraminiferal assemblages off Key Largo, Florida. Coral Reefs 15:237–248
Hallock, P. 2000. Symbiont-bearing foraminifera: harbingers of global change. Micropaleontology 46(Suppl. 1): 95–104
Hallock, P., Lidz, B.H., Cockey-Burkhard, E.M., and Donnelly, K.B. 2003. Foraminifera as bioindicators in coral reef assessment and monitoring: The FORAM Index. Environmental Monitoring and Assessment 81: 221–238
Pomar, L., P. Hallock. 2008. Carbonate factories: A conundrum in sedimentary geology. Earth Science Reviews 87: 134–169
Ross, B.J., Hallock, P. 2016. Dormancy in the Foraminifera: A review. Journal of Foraminiferal Research 46: 358–368

References

Living people
University of South Florida faculty
Women marine biologists
American marine biologists
1948 births